10th Anniversary is a greatest hits album by German DJ Sash! released on October 25, 2007 through Blanco Y Negro label. The record includes 16 hit singles, a reloaded version of Ecuador, previously unreleased songs, plus a bonus DVD including videoclips to all the songs from the album.

Track listing

CD 1

*Note: Track listing for first 10 songs is the same as Encore Une Fois - The Greatest Hits from 2000.

CD 2

Credits
Lyrics by Ralf Kappmeier (tracks: CD1 to CD11, CD13 to CD20), Sascha Lappessen (tracks: CD1 to CD11, CD13 to CD20), Thomas Alisson (tracks: CD1 to CD11, CD13 to CD20) 
Music by Ralf Kappmeier, Sascha Lappessen, Thomas Alisson 
Producer – Sash!, Tokapi 
Featurings/vocals by Sabine Ohmes, Rodriguez, La Trec, Patrizia, Tina Cousins, Shannon, Dr. Alban, Inka, Peter Faulhammer, Boy George, T.J. Davis, Sarah Brightman

References

Sash! compilation albums
2007 compilation albums
2007 video albums
Music video compilation albums
Sash! video albums
Multiply Records compilation albums
Multiply Records video albums